The Lomonosov Ridge is an unusual underwater ridge of continental crust in the Arctic Ocean. It spans  between the New Siberian Islands over the central part of the ocean to Ellesmere Island of the Canadian Arctic Archipelago. The ridge divides the Arctic Basin into the Eurasian Basin and the Amerasian Basin. Slopes of the ridge are relatively steep, broken up by canyons, and covered with layers of silt. It is an aseismic ridge.

The Lomonosov Ridge was first discovered by the Soviet high-latitude expeditions in 1948 and is named after Mikhail Lomonosov. The name was approved by the GEBCO Sub-Committee on Undersea Feature Names (SCUFN).

Territorial dispute
In the 2000s, the geological structure of the ridge attracted international attention due to a 20 December 2001 official submission by the Russian Federation to the UN Commission on the Limits of the Continental Shelf in accordance with the United Nations Convention on the Law of the Sea (article 76, paragraph 8). The document proposed establishing new outer limits for the Russian continental shelf, beyond the previous  zone, but within the Russian Arctic sector. The territory claimed by Russia in the submission is a large portion of the Arctic reaching the North Pole. One of the arguments was a statement that the underwater Lomonosov Ridge and Mendeleev Ridge are extensions of the Eurasian continent. In 2002 the UN Commission neither rejected nor accepted the Russian proposal, recommending additional research.

Danish scientists hope to prove that the ridge is an extension of Greenland, rather than an extension of Canada's adjacent Ellesmere Island, and Denmark became another claimant to the area in 2014. Canada, also a claimant, asserts that the ridge is an extension of its continental shelf. In April 2007, Canadian and Russian scientists were sent to map the ridge as a possible precedent for determining sovereignty over the area. In late June 2007, Russian scientists reiterated their claim that the ridge is an extension of Russia's territory, and in 2011 a Russian scientist ignored Canada's claim, instead saying that Russia and Denmark claim different parts of the ridge and the claims are not conflicting. Other sources indicate that some areas are disputed.

Canada is expected to make further claims. Denmark and Russia have agreed to follow certain procedures when making claims. If the Danish claims are accepted by the Commission in summer 2015, the distribution of areas may still be a matter of negotiation between claiming countries – a process which can take several years. The rhetoric used in making claims is also subject to discussion.

A 21-member UN arbitration panel is considering the competing claims, with the focus on the Lomonosov Ridge.

Arktika 2007 Expedition

In late July 2007, a Russian expedition sent an icebreaker and two mini-submarines, Mir-I and Mir-II, to explore the region. In April 2007, Canada and Denmark, which both claimed part of the ridge, were also mapping it under the polar ice, Canada's CBC reported.

As a follow-up in mid-September 2007, Russia's Natural Resources Ministry issued a statement:
Preliminary results of an analysis of the earth crust model examined by the Arctic-2007 expedition, obtained on 20 September, have confirmed that the crust structure of the Lomonosov Ridge corresponds to the world analogues of the continental crust, and it is therefore part of the Russian Federation's adjacent continental shelf.

2014 Danish claim

In 2014 Denmark filed a claim with the UN Commission for a  area around the Lomonosov Ridge, using paragraphs 4, 5 and 6 of Article 76. The connection between Greenland and Lomonosov is stated as going through the Lincoln shelf ( below the Lincoln Sea, between the Wandel Sea in the east and Cape Columbia, Canada in the west), which was pushed up when Greenland moved northwards during the late Paleozoic, Paleocene and Eocene time frames. Some rocks from the ridge are similar to those found in Ellesmere, Greenland, Scandinavia and United Kingdom. Connectivity between land and the ridge may be defined from the Foot of the Slope.

See also

Russia's 2001 continental shelf claim
Arctic policy of Russia
Gakkel Ridge

References

Bibliography
 Døssing, A., Hansen, T. M., Olesen, A. V., Hopper, J. R., & Funck, T. (2014). "Gravity inversion predicts the nature of the Amundsen Basin and its continental borderlands near Greenland" Elsevier/GEOBASE/GEUS/DTU Space – Earth and Planetary Science Letters, 408, 132–145. 12 October 2014. Accessed: 15 December 2014. Size: 15 pages in 10MB. DOI: 10.1016/j.epsl.2014.10.011 
 GEUS 2014. "The Northern Continental Shelf of Greenland (Executive Summary) " Geological Survey of Denmark and Greenland / Ministry of Climate, Energy and Building (Denmark), November 2014. Accessed: 15 December 2014. Size: 52 pages in 6MB. UN mirror

New Siberian Islands
Underwater ridges of the Arctic Ocean
Geology of the Arctic Ocean